Epicriopsis horrida is a species of mite in the family Ameroseiidae. It is found in Europe.

References

Ameroseiidae
Articles created by Qbugbot
Animals described in 1876